Rupert Carington may refer to:

 Rupert Carington, 4th Baron Carrington (1852–1929), British soldier and Liberal Party politician
 Rupert Carington, 5th Baron Carrington (1891–1938), British peer, son of the 4th Baron Carrington
 Rupert Carington, 7th Baron Carrington (born 1948), son of the 6th Baron Carrington, grandson of the 5th Baron